The Confederate Veteran was a magazine about veterans of the Confederate States Army during the American Civil War of 1861–1865, propagating the myth of the Lost Cause of the Confederacy. It was instrumental in popularizing the legend of Sam Davis.  A subsequent magazine of the same title is still in print, and is an official publication of the Sons of Confederate Veterans organization.

History
The Confederate Veteran was founded by S. A. Cunningham in Nashville, Tennessee in 1893. Initially, it began as a fundraising newsletter for the construction of a monument in honor of Jefferson Davis, the President of the Confederate States, in Richmond, Virginia. Its first issue included several articles about Jefferson Davis written by Cunningham, Abram Joseph Ryan's poem entitled, The Conquered Banner, and an article about the town of Lexington, Virginia written by J. William Jones, a Southern Baptist minister.

The magazine became "the official organ first of the United Confederate Veterans and later of the United Daughters of the Confederacy, the Sons of Confederate Veterans, and the Confederate Southern Memorial Society." Over the years, the magazine became "one of the New South's most influential monthlies." Through it, Cunningham became a leader of the Lost Cause movement. It had a readership of over 20,000 by 1900. After Cunningham's death in 1913, the second editor was Edith D. Pope. The magazine ceased publication in 1932.  The magazine came back into publication in 1984. 

Another magazine of the same name is still currently in print by the Sons of Confederate Veterans.  This current incarnation of Confederate Veteran Magazine is printed 6 times per year, and is mailed to members of the Sons of Confederate Veterans.  An online digital version is also available.  Subscriptions to the magazine can be purchased by non-members.

See also
 Southern Bivouac
 The Southern Historical Society

References

Further reading

External links
 Confederate Veteran at Wikisource – 40 volumes under construction
 Confederate Veteran at The Online Books Page
 Confederate Veteran at the Sons of Confederate Veterans

1893 establishments in Tennessee
1932 disestablishments in Tennessee
American Civil War magazines
News magazines published in the United States
Defunct magazines published in the United States
Magazines established in 1893
Magazines disestablished in 1932
Magazines published in Tennessee
Sons of Confederate Veterans
United Confederate Veterans
United Daughters of the Confederacy